Nótia (formerly Νώτια;  or ) is a village in the Exaplatanos municipal unit of the Pella regional unit, Central Macedonia, Greece. Lying at an altitude of 595 metres in the Upper Karadjova Plain, it was for centuries the largest Megleno-Romanians village, and the only one with a regular market.

The majority of Notia's Megleno-Romanian population converted to Islam in the 17th or 18th century. With the 1923 population exchange between Greece and Turkey, the Muslim Melgeno-Romanians of the village were deported to Eastern Thrace in Turkey. They were called by the Greeks as "Karadjovalis" and by the Turks after the Turkish name of their home region. They nowadays call themselves as Nantinets.

A mosque existed on the road that crosses the village, later destroyed.

Notia had 412 inhabitants in 1981. In fieldwork done by Riki Van Boeschoten in late 1993, Notia was populated by a Greek population descended from Anatolian Greek refugees who arrived during the Greek-Turkish population exchange, and Aromanians. Pontic Greek was spoken in the village by people over 30 in public and private settings. Children understood the language, but mostly did not use it. The Aromanian language was spoken in the village by people over 30 in public and private settings. Children understood the language, but mostly did not use it.

References

Megleno-Romanian settlements
Populated places in Pella (regional unit)